Electoral district of Mitcham may refer to:
Electoral district of Mitcham (South Australia)
Electoral district of Mitcham (Victoria)